The 2nd Lancers (Gardner's Horse) is one of the oldest and a highly decorated armoured regiment of the Indian Army. The regiment was formed by the amalgamation of two of the oldest regiments of the Bengal Army – the 2nd Royal Lancers (Gardner's Horse) and the 4th Cavalry.

Early history

The regiment was raised in 1809 at Farukhabad and Mainpuri by William Linnæus Gardner, who had previously served with the 74th Highlanders and later the Maratha ruler of Indore. He then joined the Company's forces under Lord Lake and raised the regiment. The regiment was initially deployed for police duties in the newly occupied territories around Agra. It was almost exclusively composed of Hindustani Mahomedans, with a small minority of Rajputs and Brahmins. Gardner was one among several British officers such as Skinner and Hearsey, who had become leaders of irregular cavalry that preserved the traditions of Mughal cavalry. This had a political purpose because it absorbed pockets of cavalrymen who might otherwise become disaffected plunderers. It first saw service in the Nepal War of 1815, a war rendered necessary by the frequent inroads by the Gurkhas into Indian territory.  The corps showed meritorious service against the Pindaris between 1817-19. In late 1819, it was employed on the Eastern frontier invading Arakan. The regiment fought on horses and after losing most of their mounts, fought on foot. They were the only regiment to win the honour ‘Arracan’.

The 4th Cavalry was raised by Captain C. Newbury at Sultanpur as a cavalry regiment under the Company's orders for service with the Nawab of Oudh in 1838. The regiment was later transferred to the Bengal Army in 1840 and saw service in Scinde and the Baloch frontier in 1844, for which they received the Honorary Standard bearing the device of a lion.

The dress of the regiment originally consisted of an emerald green alkhalak, red pai-jamaas(later changed to the "Multani Mutti" color), and the Persian "Qizilbash" hat(which was later changed to a cloth cap and then a red turban). The government usually consulted the men regarding the head-dress so that nothing could be done without their consent.

Pre-World War

The 2nd Lancers took part in the Sutlej and Punjab expeditions against the Sikhs in 1846 and 1848. In 1855, they were in Bengal quelling the Santhal rebellion. During the Indian Rebellion of 1857, the 2nd regiment saw action in Gogera and Gurdaspur districts, while the 4th fought in Multan. In 1882, the 2nd were sent to Egypt to fight dismounted at Kassassin and mounted at the Battle of Tell El Kebir.

First World War
The 2nd Lancers was sent to France in the First World War as part of the 5th (Mhow) Cavalry Brigade, 2nd Indian Cavalry Division. It was brigaded with the 6th (Inniskilling) Dragoons and the 38th King George's Own Central India Horse. Once in France, its personnel were called upon to serve in the trenches as infantry. The high number of officer casualties suffered early on had an effect on performance. British officers who understood the language, customs and psychology of their men could not be quickly replaced, and the alien environment of the Western Front had some effect on the soldiers. During their time on the Western Front, the regiment was involved in the Battle of the Somme, Battle of Bazentin, Battle of Flers–Courcelette, the Advance to the Hindenburg Line and the Battle of Cambrai.

In February 1918, they left France for Egypt, joining the Egyptian Expeditionary Force, 10th Cavalry Brigade, 4th Cavalry Division in the Desert Mounted Corps. From May 1918, the regiment took part in General Edmund Allenby's Palestine section of the Sinai and Palestine Campaign. After taking part in the Occupation of the Jordan Valley, on 20 September 1918 when infantry and cavalry divisions in three corps, enveloped two Ottoman armies in the Judean Hills during the Battle of Megiddo, the 2nd Lancers, commanded by Captain, temporary Major and Acting Lieutenant Colonel, Douglas Davison launched an improvised cavalry charge which broke the Ottoman line defending the Jezreel Valley. Captain D.S. Davison was awarded the DSO for his part in this battle. On the same day, the 4th Cavalry Division captured the towns of Afulah and Beisan, along with around 100 German personnel, aircraft, trucks and railway stock. The regiment was also involved in Lieutenant General Harry Chauvel's pursuit to Damascus along the Pilgrims Road via Deraa.  The regiment returned to India in December 1920.

The 4th Cavalry proceeded to France in 1914 as the Meerut Divisional Cavalry. At the Battle of Festubert, they were rushed into battle and along with the 2nd Black Watch, held the line fighting in the trenches in hand to hand combat and with their lances.  They were transferred to Iraq in the winter of 1915 and took part in the actions to relieve Kut. The 4th finally arrived in India in the winter of 1917.

Gallantry awards
Victoria Cross : The regiment's only Victoria Cross was awarded, during the First World War, to Gobind Singh a Lance-Daffadar (corporal) in the 27th Light Cavalry attached to the 2nd Lancers (Gardner's Horse). On 12 December 1917, east of Pezières, Singh volunteered three times to carry messages between the regiment and brigade headquarters, a distance of 1.5 miles (2.4 km) over open ground which was under heavy fire. He succeeded in delivering the messages, although on each occasion his horse was shot from under him and he was compelled to finish the journey on foot.
Albert Medal : The Albert Medal is awarded for "daring and heroic actions performed by mariners and others in danger of perishing, by reason of wrecks and other perils of the sea". It was awarded on 15 March 1919 to Trooper Mangal Sain, 2nd Indian Lancers (Gardner's Horse) at Beirut, Lebanon. Whilst guarding a party of Turkish POWs who were being allowed to swim, he saved a prisoner and a British soldier from drowning.
Distinguished Service Order : Captain Douglas Stewart Davison
Military Cross : Captain Edward William Drummond Vaughan, Lieutenant Ernest St. John King, Risaldar Mukand Singh (2nd Lancers) 
Order of British India : Risaldar Mukand Singh, Risaldar Major Ganga Dat, Risaldar Suraj Singh (2nd Lancers); Risaldar Major Awal Khan, Risaldar Major Saddha Singh, Risaldar Major Kanaya Ram (4th Cavalry)
Indian Order of Merit : Risaldar Suraj Singh, Sowar / Acting Lance Dafadar Udey Singh, Lance Dafadar Anokh Singh, Sowar Liakat Hussain, Acting Lance Dafadar Sahib Singh, Sowar Shahzad Khan, Dafadar Chuni Lal (2nd Lancers); Lance Dafadar Puran Singh, Lance Dafadar Khazan Singh (4th Cavalry)
Indian Distinguished Service Medal : 2nd Lancers – 26 medals, 4th Cavalry – 5 medals
Indian Meritorious Service Medal : 2nd Lancers – 51 medals, 4th Cavalry –  10 medals
Médaille militaire : Kot Dafadar Sant Singh (2nd Lancers)
Croix de guerre (Belgium) : Sowar Banagopal Singh (2nd Lancers)
Cross of Kara George, 1st Class with Swords : Lance Dafadar Khazan Singh (4th Cavalry)
Medal of St. George, 1st Class : Dafadar Amanatullah Khan (4th Cavalry)

Amalgamation
In late 1920, the 4th Cavalry were sent to Palestine on occupation duties, not returning to India until January 1922. At Bombay, in April 1922 they amalgamated with the 2nd Lancers (Gardner's Horse) to form the 2nd/4th Cavalry. However this title was short-lived and the new unit was retitled 2nd Lancers (Gardner's Horse) by July 1922.

Second World War
The regiment served in the Western Desert campaign during the Second World War as part of the 3rd Indian Motor Brigade, 7th Armoured Division. It was brigaded with the 18th King Edward's Own Cavalry and the 11th Prince Albert Victor's Own Cavalry (Frontier Force). It also supplied men for the Indian Long Range Squadron. It fought during the first Axis offensive, their counter-attack following Operation Compass.

In 1942, during the Battle of Gazala, the 3rd Indian Motor Brigade was based near Bir Hacheim and formed the southernmost point of the Gazala Line. On 27 May 1942, Italy's Ariete Armoured Division overran the brigade. After this action, the shattered remains of the brigade were reformed at Buq Buq. The brigade was formed into two strong columns, Shercol and Billicol, with the 2nd Royal Lancers supplying some men and equipment to both. The remainder of the regiment were assigned to protect the rear Brigade headquarters and the "B" echelons. Neither column lasted long. In the early hours of 24 June 1942, Shercol was smashed after running into an Italian force in the dark. This provide to be the end of the 3rd Indian Motor Brigade's role in the Desert War. On 30 June, the Brigade handed over 50 per cent of its vehicles to the Eighth Army. The brigade was dispersed in July, the 2nd Lancers moved to Haifa in Palestine. The brigade was reformed in August. It travelled overland to Sahneh in Persia via Baghdad, coming under the command of 31st Indian Armoured Division. It remained there until late November, when they moved to Shaibah, seven miles 7 miles (11 km) from Basra. From here the Regiment returned to India in January 1943.

After a three-month stay at Ferozepore, the Regiment moved to Risalpur, where it was converted to an Armoured Car Regiment, in  Training Brigade. In October, the regiment marched to Quetta. The same month, Lieutenant-Colonel Maharaj Rajendra Sinhji became the first Indian to take over the command of the regiment, and was also the first Indian to command an armoured regiment. In May 1944, the regiment moved again to Allahabad, then Lucknow after a short stay then back to the frontier in October to Kohat, relieving the 16th Light Cavalry. They were still at Kohat when the war ended.

Gallantry awards
Distinguished Service Order : Major Raj Kumar Shri Rajendrasinghji
Military Cross : Captain A.H. McConnel, Captain D McV Reynolds, 2nd J.E. Miller, Captain CF Williams, Jemadar Hari Raj Singh, Jemadar Lakhi Ram, Jemadar Ran Pratap Singh
Indian Order of Merit : Lance Dafadar Mehbub Ali Khan
Indian Distinguished Service Medal : Risaldar Lakhan Singh, Daffadar Risal Singh, Daffadar Ghulam Rabani
Military Medal : Sowar Mohd Salim Khan

Post Independence
In August 1947, the Regiment was based on Malaya and fought against the communist guerrillas. In December, the regiment returned to India. As part of the Indian Partition, the regiment split. Several troops of 'A' Squadron, who were Muslim, opted to join the Pakistani Army. They set sail for Karachi during November 1947. In 1948, the remaining Muslim soldiers were posted to the 18th King Edward's Own Cavalry, and in turn the 2nd Lancers received a Rajput squadron. The regiment was then formed of two Rajput and one Jat squadron.

In January 1953, General Maharaj Rajendra Shinji assumed the appointment of the Chief of Army Staff of the Indian army. He was the first officer from the 2nd Lancers, as well as from the Armoured Corps, to become the Army Chief. In November 1961, the regiment (as well as the Scinde Horse) was awarded a guidon by the President, Rajendra Prasad for its distinguished record during peacetime and wartime, the first regiment in the armoured corps to have such an award.

1965 War
In September 1965, the 2nd Lancers took part in the Indo-Pakistani War of 1965 as part of the 43 Lorried Brigade Group of the 1st Armoured Division. The regiment was equipped with M4 Sherman tanks (Mk V and VI variants), and fought in the Battle of Phillora and the Battle of Chawinda. For their performance in these battles, the regiment was awarded the honour of "PUNJAB". Sowar Jit Singh Sansanwal was awarded the Sena Medal and 4 were mentioned in despatches.

Post-war

On 10 August 1966, following the war, the regiment was the first in the military to receive the Vijayanta main battle tanks, the first indigenously built Indian tanks. The regiment is currently equipped with Soviet-era T-72 tanks.

Regiment's name changes
Like all regiments of the Indian Army, the 2nd Lancers (Gardner's Horse) underwent many name changes during various reorganisations, as listed below -
1809 Gardner's Horse
1823 2nd (Gardner's) Local horse
1840 2nd Irregular Cavalry
1861 2nd Regt. of Bengal Cavalry
1890 2nd Regt. Of Bengal Lancers
1901 2nd Bengal Lancers
1903 2nd Lancers (Gardner's Horse)
1922 (April) 2nd/4th Cavalry
1922 (July) 2nd Lancers (Gardner's Horse)
1935 2nd Royal Lancers (Gardner's Horse)
1947 To Indian Army upon Partition
1950 2nd Lancers (Gardner's Horse) upon India becoming a Republic

Battle Honours

Arracan, Sobraon, Punjaub, Mooltan, Afghanistan 1879-80, Tel-El-Kabir, Egypt 1882, La Bassee 1914, Givenchy 1914, Neuve Chapelle, Festubert 1915, Somme 1916, Morval, Cambrai 1917, France and Flanders 1914-18, Egypt 1915, Meggido, Sharon Damascus, Palestine 1918, Tigris 1916, Mesopotamia 1915-16, Afghanistan 1919, North Africa 1940-43, Point 171, Punjab.

Regimental Day

During First World War, for its gallant actions in the battle of Cambrai in France the regiment was mentioned in the Cambrai Despatch by Field Marshall Lord Douglas Haig. Since, then Cambrai day i.e. 30 November is celebrated as a Battle Honour day.

Alliance

The alliance between the Royal Tank Regiment and 2nd Lancers (Gardner's Horse) was promulgated in Defence Council Instruction (Army) T 52 of 1973.

Notable Officers
General Maharaj Shri Rajendrasinhji Jadeja,  was the first Chief of Army Staff (COAS). On 1 July 1993, General Bipin Chandra Joshi,  became the second officer from the regiment to become the COAS. The Regiment also holds the distinction of having produced two Army Commanders, Lieutenant General Hriday Kaul  (GOC-in-C Western Command) and Lieutenant General R Sharma  (Deputy Chief of the Army Staff).

Regimental Insignia
The 2nd Bengal Lancers insignia consisted of four crossed lances with the letters ‘’2BL’’, whereas the 4th Bengal Lancers had two crossed lances overlaid by the crown and mounted by the lion passant guardant – derived from the Honorary Standard it received in 1844. Earning the nickname, the “Sindh Lions” all ranks of the Regiment were authorized to wear on its accoutrements a badge representing a unique Lion “Passant Ragardant”. The lances are overlaid by a scroll with the word ‘’SCINDE’’ and the Roman numeral ‘’IV’’.

Following the amalgamation of the successor units, the 2nd Lancers insignia combined elements from both units – it consisted of a central voided lion surrounded by circular band with HONI SOIT QUI MAL Y PENSE, all superimposed on four crossed lances with the crown above the band. Post independence, the insignia consists of a lion passant reguardant surrounded by a belt inside which is the embossed inscription: SECOND LANCERS (G.H.), the belt is surmounted by the Lions of Ashoka and is backed by four crossed lances. Second Lancers (Gardener's Horse) is the only unit in the Indian Army which is authorised to bear its unique insignia of the Lion on all its vehicles during peace time.

The shoulder title consisted of "2RL" prior to independence and "2L" after independence.

References

Further reading
Kempton, C (1996). A Register of Titles of the Units of the H.E.I.C. & Indian Armies 1666–1947. Bristol: British Empire & Commonwealth Museum. 
Gaylor, J (1992). Sons of John Company: The Indian and Pakistan Armies 1903– 1991. Stroud: Spellmount Publishers Ltd. 
D.E.Whitworth (2005) (Paperback edition) History of the 2nd Lancers (Gardner's Horse) from 1809–1922. Naval & Military Press Ltd. 
 Vaughan, (C.B., D.S.O., M.C.) Brigadier E.W.D. (1951). A history of the 2nd Royal Lancers (Gardner's Horse) (1922–1947). Sifton Praed & Co. Ltd.

External links
 Uniforms of the late 19th Century

British Indian Army cavalry regiments
Honourable East India Company regiments
Military units and formations established in 1809
Military units and formations disestablished in 1946
Indian World War I regiments
Indian World War II regiments
Armoured regiments of World War II
Armoured and cavalry regiments of the Indian Army from 1947